The All-Ireland Senior B Hurling Championship of 1980 was the seventh staging of Ireland's secondary hurling knock-out competition.  Kildare won the championship, beating London 2-20 to 2-14 in the final at Croke Park, Dublin.

Results

All-Ireland Senior B Hurling Championship

References

 Donegan, Des, The Complete Handbook of Gaelic Games (DBA Publications Limited, 2005).

1980
B